Double Arena is a 1984 supplement for Car Wars published by Steve Jackson Games.

Gameplay
Double Arena is a supplement in which two gigantic arenas are constructed by matching up the two double-sided mapsheets.

Reception
Craig Sheeley reviewed Double Arena in Space Gamer No. 70. Sheeley commented that "Double Arena is a nice switch from the Armadillo A.A., or Midville, or whatever area you've been using.  If your arena fighters need a new place to shed blood, or if you want new (and good) counters, or if you love the idea of a slalom, then Double Arena is for you."

References

Car Wars